Tutu Jones (born September 9, 1966) is an American electric blues and soul blues guitarist, singer and songwriter. He has cited Freddie King and Z. Z. Hill as influences on his playing style. Since 1994, Jones has released five albums.

Life and career
John Jones Jr. was born in Dallas, Texas, United States, the son of a Dallas-based R&B guitarist, Johnny B. Jones. Through his father's work, he was introduced to house guests such as Freddie King, L. C. Clark, Ernie Johnson and Little Joe Blue. Jones began playing the guitar by the age of five, by which time he had acquired his nickname Tutu from his father.

He began his career in adolescence, as a drummer, graduating from backing his uncles Barefoot Miller and L. C. Clark (the latter in 1976) to working with Z. Z. Hill and R. L. Burnside.

Meanwhile, working on his own guitar playing, by 1989 Jones had moved on to fronting his own bands. This in led to the recording of his debut album, I'm For Real, on JSP Records in 1994. It was nominated for a W. C. Handy Award. Blues Texas Soul followed two years later, and Staying Power in 1998.

A live album, Tutu Jones Live, was issued in 2005 by Doc Blues Records. A journalist at the Austin Chronicle then stated, "bluesmen are traditionalists, but Jones learns how to mesh soulful wails with syrupy blues that are as sweaty live as they are in quiet studios."

His album Inside Out was released by CD Baby in 2009.

Discography

See also
List of country blues musicians
List of electric blues musicians
List of soul-blues musicians
List of Texas blues musicians

References

External links
Official website

1966 births
Living people
American blues singers
American male singers
American blues guitarists
American male guitarists
Electric blues musicians
Texas blues musicians
Soul-blues musicians
Country blues musicians
Songwriters from Texas
Musicians from Dallas
Guitarists from Texas
20th-century American drummers
American male drummers
20th-century American guitarists
20th-century American male musicians
JSP Records artists
Rounder Records artists
American male songwriters